This list contains songs written by Tina Turner, including those where she is credited as a co-writer. 

As half of the duo Ike & Tina Turner, Turner began writing in the late 1960s. At the encouragement of her husband Ike Turner, she began writing more once they created their own recording studio, Bolic Sound, in 1970. By 1972, she was recognized as an established writer. Turner wrote nine out of the ten songs on the duo's 1972 album Feel Good. Following their divorce in 1978, Turner retained songwriter royalties from songs she had written, but Ike Turner received the publishing royalties for his compositions and hers.

Songs

References 

Turner, Tina, List of songs written by